The Hollywood Music in Media Award for Best Original Song in a Documentary is one of the awards given annually to people working in the motion picture industry by the Hollywood Music in Media Awards (HMMA). It is presented to the songwriters who have composed the best "original" song, written specifically for a documentary film or series. The award was first given in 2014, during the fifth annual awards.

Winners and nominees

2010s

2020s

See also
Academy Award for Best Original Song

References

Best Original Song in a Documentary
Film awards for Best Song
Awards established in 2014